Hugh G. Guernsey (August 10, 1892 – August 18, 1992) was an American politician and World War I veteran from the state of Iowa.

Guernsey was born in Centerville, Appanoose County, Iowa in 1892. He served as a Democrat in the Iowa Senate from 1936 to 1941. He died in Des Moines, Polk County, Iowa in 1992 at 100 years of age. He was interred in Oakland Cemetery in Centerville, Iowa.

References

1892 births
1992 deaths
American centenarians
Democratic Party Iowa state senators
Men centenarians
People from Centerville, Iowa
20th-century American politicians